Adelaide Angels Baseball Club is a Baseball Club in Adelaide, South Australia, The club plays in the South Australian Baseball League. The club is based at Weigall Oval in Plympton a suburb of Adelaide.

References

External links
Adelaide Baseball Club (Archived 2009-10-24)

Australian baseball clubs
Sporting clubs in Adelaide
Baseball teams established in 1908
1908 establishments in Australia